Synobius is a genus of beetles in the family Silvanidae, containing the following species:

 Synobius lobatus Grouvelle
 Synobius lobicollis Sharp

References

Silvanidae